Antirrhinum multiflorum (syn. Sairocarpus multiflorus) is a species of New World snapdragon known by the common name Sierra snapdragon.

It is endemic to California, where it is known from the central Coast Ranges, the Transverse Ranges, and one section of the Sierra Nevada foothills. It grows on lower-elevation mountain slopes and springs up in disturbed and recently burned areas. This is an annual or perennial herb producing a hairy, erect stem which often has a woody base. It does not cling or climb like some other snapdragon species. Small, pointed leaves are arranged alternately about the tall stem. The raceme inflorescence occupies the top of the stem with many pink or red snapdragon flowers between one and two centimeters long each.

External links
Jepson Manual Treatment
USDA Plants Profile
Photo gallery

multiflorum
Flora of California
Flora without expected TNC conservation status